Toda may refer to:

Toda people
Toda language
Toda Embroidery
Toda lattice
Toda field theory
Oscillator Toda
Toda (surname), a Japanese surname
Queen Toda of Navarre (fl. 885–970)
Toda, Saitama, Japan
TODA Racing, who tune and race vehicles in various racing series, and additionally sell aftermarket parts to automotive enthusiasts
Toda bracket
Toda fibration
Takeoff Distance Available, see Runway#Declared distances
Theatre of Digital Art, Dubai, UAE

Language and nationality disambiguation pages